Øyvind Halleraker (born 27 October 1951, in Oslo) is a Norwegian politician representing the Conservative Party. He is currently a representative of Hordaland in the Storting and was first elected in 2001.

Parliamentary Committee duties
2005–2009 member of the Transportation and Communication committee.
2001–2005 member of the Energy and Environment committee.

External links
 Hordaland Høyre
 Bømlo municipality

1951 births
Living people
Conservative Party (Norway) politicians
Members of the Storting
21st-century Norwegian politicians